Wang Ji may refer to:

  (王吉), Eastern Han official
 Wang Ji (Three Kingdoms) (王基; 190-261), Wei general
 Wang Ji (Ming dynasty politician) (王驥; 1378-1460), Ming dynasty politician
 Wang Ji (physician) (汪機; 1463-1539), Ming dynasty physician
 Wang Ji (philosopher) (王幾; 1498–1583), a.k.a. Wang Longxi (王龍溪), Ming dynasty Chinese philosopher in the school of Wang Yangming
 , scholar of the Ming and Qing period, editor of the Ming History
 Chi Wang or Wang Ji, co-founder of U.S. China Policy Foundation
  (王姬, born 1960), Chinese actress

See also
Wang Jie (disambiguation)